Irtysh-Air  (Kazakh: АО Авиакомпания "Иртыш-Аир"; AO Avıakompanııa "Irtysh-Aır") was an airline headquartered in Ekibastuz, Pavlodar Province, Kazakhstan. Despite the airline being based at Pavlodar Airport, it operates a domestic network within that country from its hub in Almaty International Airport. , the company is banned from operating within the European Union.

History

Irtysh–Air started operations on 22 April 2009 with a Pavlodar–Moscow-Domodedovo service.

On 11 May 2010, the Ministry of Transport and Communications of the Government of Kazakhstan authorised the carrier to operate on several domestic routes radiating from Almaty.

In , following the Ministry of Transport and Communications revoking the operator certificate to  airlines, it was informed that Irtysh Air could also lose its license.

On 18 October 2013, the AOC of Irtysh Air was suspended for a further unspecified period.

Its certificate expired on 4 April 2014. As of 31 January 2018, Irtysh Air does not exist in the "List of operating airlines and operators of the Republic of Kazakhstan."

Destinations 

, the airline served the following destinations:

Kazakhstan 

Almaty – Almaty International Airport
Karaganda – Karaganda Airport
Kostanay – Narimanovka Airport
Kyzylorda – Kyzylorda Airport
Oskemen – Oskemen Airport
Pavlodar – Pavlodar Airport

Terminated destinations

Russia 
MoscowDomodedovo International Airport

Fleet 
The Irtysh-Air fleet comprises the following aircraft:

See also

List of airlines of Kazakhstan
Transport in Kazakhstan

References

External links
 

Airlines of Kazakhstan
Airlines established in 2007